Neptune Finswimming Club is a finswimming club based in Bristol in the United Kingdom and who is affiliated to the British Finswimming Association.

History 
The Neptune Finswimming Club was formed in June 2011. The very first session ran on 22 June 2011 in Thornbury Leisure Centre with just two people attending. As of March 2018, the club claims to be one of the largest finswimming club in the UK with over 30 members and providing sessions for children and adults.

Competitions 
Over the last several years, Neptune Finswimming Club took part in a number of national and international competitions. The club took the lead on organising national finswimming events in 2013–2019.

Participated and organised competitions:

 23/03/2018-24/03/2018 - World Cup Round in Italy, Lignano Sabbiadoro (4 National Records)
 16/03/2019 - Finswimming Gala Chester (Runners up, 11 National Records)
 24/11/2018 - Short Course British Finswimming Championships London (Club winner, 3 National Records)
 16/06/2018 - Long Course British Finswimming Championship Bath (Runners up, 2 National Records)
 24/03/2018-25/03/2018 - World Cup Round in Italy, Lignano Sabbiadoro (3 National Records)
 2/12/2017  - Short Course British Finswimming Championships London (Club winner, 3 National Records)
 25/03/2017-26/03/2017 - World Cup Round in Italy, Lignano Sabbiadoro
 4/03/2017 - Finswimming Gala, Bristol (Runners up, 2 National Records)
 3/12/2016 - Short Course British Finswimming Championships London (Club winner, 1 National Record)
 24/09/2016 - Long Course British Finswimming Championships Aldershot
 30/04/2016 - Finswimming Gala, Bristol (Club winner)
 5/12/2015 - British Open Finswimming Championships, London (Club winner)
 29/11/2014 - 1st LondonFin Cup, London (1 National Record) 
 7/06/2014 - Finswimming Gala, Bristol
 7/12/2013 - Finswimming Gala, Bristol
 21/09/2013-22/09/2013 - Belgian Open Finswimming Championships, Nivelles (1 National Record)
 2/4/2011 - As part of FinWorld club some of club members took part in BFA Short Course Championships, Edenbridge

Achievements 
As of April 2018, Neptune Finswimming Club members hold 16 National Records and many age group records in different events.

National records:
 Long course (50m pool)
 50m apnea men : 17.40 by Andrei Oleinik
 200m surface men : 1:49.09 by Andrei Oleinik
 50m bi-fins junior - boys : 22.91 by Anton Oleinik
 100m bi-fins junior - boys : 50.82 by Anton Oleinik
 200m bi-fins junior - boys : 1:57.36 by Anton Oleinik
 Short course (25m pool)
 50m bi-fins men: 21.65 by Daniel Weightman
 100m bi-fins men : 50.16 by Daniel Weightman
 200m bi-fins men : 1:53.91 by Daniel Weightman
 25m bi-fins junior - boys : 10.65 by Anton Oleinik
 50m bi-fins junior - boys : 23.13 by Anton Oleinik
 100m bi-fins junior - boys : 52.28 by Anton Oleinik
 200m bi-fins junior - boys : 02:02.25 by Anton Oleinik
 100m bi-fins	women : 00:59.34 by Christine Howie
 200m bi-fins women : 02:07.81 by Christine Howie
 25m surface junior - girls : 10.84 by Jasmine Farrer
 200m surface	junior - girls : 01:56.50 by Jasmine Farrer

Allies 
A part of other finswimming clubs, Neptune Finswimming Club has tight relationships with Bristol Freedivers club, providing coaching for finswimming technique to their members.

References

External links 
 Neptune Finswimming Club

Clubs and societies in based in Bristol
Finswimming in the United Kingdom
Sport in Bristol
Diving clubs